Cows on Hourglass Pond is the third solo studio album by American musician Avey Tare. It was released on March 22, 2019 by Domino Recording Company. The album follows 2017's Eucalyptus and was supported by a tour. Its announcement was accompanied by the release of the video for "Saturdays (Again)", directed by Avey Tare's sister, Abby Portner.

Recording
The album was recorded directly onto a TASCAM 48 half-inch reel-to-reel tape machine at Laughing Gas studio in Asheville, North Carolina, from January to March 2018. It was mixed by Portner and Adam McDaniel at Drop of Sun Studios, in Asheville, NC.

Composition
"Saturdays (Again)" was noted as being somewhat similar to the sound of Eucalyptus in that it is acoustic, but "within a lush and dubby mix, atop melodic synth bass, [and] accompanied by peals of lead guitar", according to Spin. It was also considered "low-key" with few vocal effects.

Track listing

References

2019 albums
Avey Tare albums